The WPA 10-Ball World Championship 2008 was a ten-ball pool tournament held from September 29 to October 5, 2008, at the Philippine International Convention Center in Pasay, Metro Manila, Philippines. The first edition of the WPA World Ten-ball Championship, it featured a field of 128 players competing in a double-elimination and then single-elimination tournament. The total prize fund for the event was $400,000 with $100,000 being awarded to the winner.

The event was won by England's Darren Appleton, winning his first world championship, defeating nineteen year old Taiwanese Wu Chia-ching in the final 13–11. The event was boycotted by many top Filipino players, such as Efren Reyes, due to an issue with sponsors Raya Sports.

Format
The 128 participating players were divided into 16 groups, in which they competed in a double elimination tournament against each other. The remaining 64 players in each group qualified for the final round played in the knockout system. The event was played under the alternating  format.

Prize money
Below was the advertised prize fund for the event. The event saw the largest amount of prize money for the event, with $400,000 being paid, and the winner's share of $100,000 won by Darren Appleton. The event was boycotted by some players due to not receiving payment from organiser's Raya sports. The event's prize money payments were delayed, with winner Appleton not receiving payment for over a month after the event. All prize money was eventually paid to players, including Appleton.

Tournament summary
Other results: 5th through 8th: Nick Van Den Berg, Charlie Williams, Liu Haitao, Mika Immonen; 9th through 16th: Shane Van Boening, Mark Gray, Ralf Souquet, Yang Ching-shun, Jerico Banares, Marlon Manalo, Fu Che-wei, and Satoshi Kawabata.

Nineteen-year-old Wu Chia-ching defeated Filipino Demosthenes Pulpul 11–8 in the semi-finals, October 4. Using a borrowed cue stick, Wu reached the title match of the event. Pulpul, meanwhile, would go on to compete against Niels "the Terminator" Feijen of the Netherlands for 3rd place (see below for details). Earlier, Pulpul had defeated Liu Haitao (11–8) of China in the quarter-finals, while Feijen lost to Darren Appleton of England, 9–11.

Appleton squared off with Wu for the $100,000 (₱4,715,000 or UK£56,000) 1st prize on October 5,
 and claimed an upset victory over Wu, 13–11. He said of his win: "I've waited 16 years for this and have to enjoy the moment. I had mixed feelings and I was looking back at my disappointments in the past. I was ranked first in the world [earlier in the decade] but I have never won a world championship. I saved my best game for the finals. I really wanted to dictate the tempo of the game, but the breaks just didn’t go my way. It was a good game. I played well this time. He was a tough player but I made fewer mistakes than him. It was a dream come true for me and I'm happy to win the title here in the Philippines. I would love to be back here."

Appleton was also quoted as saying: "Pool is an easy choice for me as a sport as I have to choose among boxing, football and pool among others. But this victory is sweeter for me and I have to dedicate this to my parents, whose relationship is in the rocks. With the $100,000 grand prize, first, I have to give some to my parents, because we had a difficult way of living."

Wu, nicknamed Taisun ("Little Genius") settled for the runner-up prize of $40,000, and remarked, "I didn't have a good break in the last game and that was crucial to me." In the third-place battle, Feijen defeated Pulpul, 11–8, and received $25,000 (₱1,178,000) to Pulpul's $15,000.

WPA president Ian Anderson announced: "This early, there's a strong clamor for the WTBC and it will definitely be back next year in Manila. It will be staged October of next year and there's also the Philippine Open to be held June 2009. I think Manila is the best place to go in hosting pool and it is living up to its billing as the pool Mecca in Asia." The event would later return in 2009.

Knockout round 
Below is the results from the knockout round. Players in bold denote match winners.

References

External links

2008
WPA World Ten-ball Championship
WPA World Ten-ball Championship
International sports competitions hosted by the Philippines